Brezje pri Dovškem is a settlement in the hills north of Brestanica in the Municipality of Krško in eastern Slovenia. The area is part of the traditional region of Styria. It is now included with the rest of the municipality in the Lower Sava Statistical Region.

Name
The name of the settlement was changed from Brezje to Brezje pri Dovškem in 1953.

Church
The local church, built on a hill south of the main core of the settlement, is dedicated to Saint Paul. It belongs to the Parish of Senovo. It is a Baroque church built in the late 17th century.

References

External links
Brezje pri Dovškem on Geopedia

Populated places in the Municipality of Krško